U of D may refer to:

in the Republic of Ireland
University of Dublin

in the United States
University of Dallas, a Catholic university in Texas
University of Dayton, a university in Ohio
University of Delaware
University of Detroit Jesuit High School and Academy, a Catholic secondary school in Michigan
University of Detroit Mercy, a Catholic university in Michigan

in India
University of Delhi

See also
 UD (disambiguation)